"Take Good Care of You and Me" is a duet by American singers Dionne Warwick and Jeffrey Osborne. It was written by Burt Bacharach, Carole Bayer Sager, and Gerry Goffin, while production was helmed by Bacharach and Bayer Sager. Initially recorded for Warwick's 1987 album Reservations for Two (1987), it was left unused in favor of their other duet "Love Power" and later served as the lead single from her compilation album Greatest Hits: 1979–1990 (1989). "Take Good Care of You and Me" peaked at number 25 on the US Adult Contemporary.

Track listings

Credits and personnel
Credits lifted from the liner notes of Greatest Hits: 1979–1990.

Burt Bacharach – producer, writer
Carole Bayer Sager – producer, writer
Gerry Goffin – writer
Jeffrey Osborne – vocals
Dionne Warwick – vocals

Charts

References

1989 singles
Dionne Warwick songs
1989 songs
Arista Records singles
Songs with music by Burt Bacharach
Songs written by Carole Bayer Sager